Traveller Supplement Adventure 13: Signal GK is a 1985 role-playing game adventure for Traveller, written by Marc W. Miller, and published by Game Designers' Workshop.

Plot summary
Signal GK is an adventure set in the Solomani Rim in which the player characters must help an eccentric researcher defect to the Imperium.

Reception
Craig Sheeley reviewed Signal GK in Space Gamer No. 75, writing:

References

Role-playing game supplements introduced in 1985
Traveller (role-playing game) adventures